The Frauen DFB-Pokal 1987–88 was the 8th season of the cup competition, Germany's second-most important title in women's football. In the final which was held in Berlin on 28 May 1988 TSV Siegen defeated Bayern Munich 4–1, thus winning their third cup in a row. It was their third cup title overall, too.

Participants

First round

Quarter-finals

Semi-finals

Final

See also 

 1987–88 DFB-Pokal men's competition

References 

Fra
DFB-Pokal Frauen seasons